Marissa Livingston (born June 6, 1991) is an American beauty pageant titleholder from Albuquerque, New Mexico, who was crowned Miss New Mexico 2015. She competed for the Miss America 2016 title in September 2015.

Early life and education
Livingston is a native of Albuquerque, New Mexico, and a 2009 graduate of Del Norte High School. Livingston is a 2013 graduate of the University of New Mexico where she earned a Bachelor of Arts degree in journalism and communications. While a student at UNM, Livingston became a member of the Pi Beta Phi international fraternity for women. She was chosen as UNM's homecoming queen in 2012. She works at a public relations firm.

Pageant career

Early pageants
On October 26, 2013, Livingston won the Miss Rio Rancho 2014 title. She competed in the 2014 Miss New Mexico pageant with the platform "For the Kids" and a dance performance in the talent portion of the competition. She was named was fourth runner-up to winner Jessica Burson. Livingston went on to represent New Mexico at the National Sweetheart pageant in Hoopeston, Illinois.

Miss New Mexico 2015
Livingston entered the Miss New Mexico pageant on the Eastern New Mexico University campus in June 2015 as Miss Duke City 2015, one of 23 qualifiers for the state title. Livingston's competition talent was a jazz dance to the song "I'm Gonna Live Till I Die" by Queen Latifah. Her platform is "For the Kids", supporting the University of New Mexico Children's Hospital through dance marathons.

Livingston won the competition on Saturday, June 20, 2015, when she received her crown from outgoing Miss New Mexico titleholder Jessica Burson. She earned more than $6,000 in scholarship money and other prizes from the state pageant. As Miss New Mexico, her activities include public appearances across the state of New Mexico.

Vying for Miss America 2016
Livingston was New Mexico's representative at the Miss America 2016 pageant in Atlantic City, New Jersey, in September 2015. In the televised finale on September 13, 2015, she placed outside the Top 15 semi-finalists and was eliminated from competition. She was awarded a $3,000 scholarship prize as her state's representative. In addition, Livingston was awarded the $1,000 John Curran Non-Finalist Interview scholarship.

References

External links

Miss New Mexico official website

Living people
1991 births
American beauty pageant winners
Miss America 2016 delegates
People from Albuquerque, New Mexico
University of New Mexico alumni